Albert Michael Groh III (born December 19, 1971) is an American football coach and former quarterback who is the wide receivers coach for the New York Giants of the National Football League (NFL). He previously served as the wide receivers coach of the Indianapolis Colts and as an assistant coach for the Los Angeles Rams, Chicago Bears and New York Jets. He is a former starting quarterback at the University of Virginia.

Playing career

High school
Groh attended Randolph High School in Randolph, New Jersey, graduating in 1991. He played football for the Randolph Rams, starting as the team's quarterback, safety, placekicker and punter.

In Groh's last game, Randolph faced off against Montclair High School on December 1, 1990 in the New Jersey North 2, Group 4 sectional state championship game, which was held at Woodman Field in Montclair in what became of significance in the history of New Jersey high school athletics.  While the matchup was already highly anticipated as it was the first-time meeting between the two storied New Jersey football programs, it was also further enhanced by several notable subplots.  Randolph, ranked number two in the state, had entered the game sharing a state record for consecutive victories with 48 while Montclair was the top ranked team in the state and sixth in the United States.  Ironically, it was on this very same field seventeen years earlier that Montclair had ended Westfield High's then state record 48 game unbeaten streak that Randolph was seeking to overtake.

For Groh and the Rams though, the game itself had taken on greater meaning as it was seventeen days after the sudden death of Randolph head coach John Bauer, Sr.  The legendary New Jersey high school coach and face of the program had battled a long time illness but had not planned to retire until the winning streak was snapped so as not to burden his successor, his son, with sustaining the program's winning streak.  Circumstances with the elder Bauer's death nonetheless forced his son John, Jr., the team's offensive coordinator, to take over the head coaching duties streak intact as the team was headed into the playoffs.  This included shutting out perennial state power Union High coached by the great Lou Rettino one week prior. But in this state championship game, Montclair was heavily favored as despite having not lost a game in over four years, Randolph was in its first year playing Group 4 playoff competition which represented the largest schools in New Jersey.  Previously the Rams had won four consecutive Group 3 state titles.

Groh's undersized Randolph team, with ten players playing both offense and defense and none weighing over two-hundred pounds, seemed at times to be outmatched during the game by the physically larger and more athletic Montclair team.  But some fortunate breaks helped keep the Rams, a team especially known then for its grit and disciplined clutch play, in the game.  This included an offensive fumble recovery in the end zone that resulted in an improbable Randolph touchdown.

However the most improbable events occurred towards the end of the game with Groh's team trailing 21-19 and driving late in the game. With a little more than a minute remaining and already in field goal range, the Rams turned the ball over deep in Montclair territory and at which point many of the estimated fifteen thousand in attendance began to file out of the venue. On Montclair's first down, the Mounties lined up in victory formation, snapped and the kneeled down the ball.  Considering the play took no more than about ten seconds, it was noted the clock operator inexplicably allowed over twenty seconds on the clock to be run off.  Montclair then attempted to run the clock down as far as they could, with the idea that they would take a delay of game penalty and have approximately three seconds left to punt the ball out of their own endzone.  However, a clock error resulted in the scoreboard clock ticking to zero and caused the Montclair fans to rush the field in apparent victory. This not only resulted in a delay of game penalty being called on Montclair, but the officials determined the clock should have seven seconds left on it.  Montclair next was only able to come up with an eleven-yard punt with Randolph's strong rush nearly blocking it.  The punt itself was noticeably also held up by a gust of wind, that was fair caught on the twenty yard line with one second left.  Groh then kicked the winning 37 yard field goal as time expired to give Randolph its miraculous record breaking victory and the de facto state championship in what The Star-Ledger of Newark later named the greatest New Jersey high school game ever played.

College
Groh enrolled at the University of Virginia in the fall of 1991 and was redshirted as a true freshman.  He served as a backup quarterback during his redshirt freshman season in 1992 and replaced struggling starter Bobby Goodman in a late season game against N.C. State.  However, in the 1993 season, Groh lost the quarterback competition to fellow redshirt sophomore Symmion Willis and again served as a backup.  In the first game of the 1994 season against Clemson, Groh alternated with Willis when the offense struggled during a 6–3 win.  Groh and Willis continued to alternate at quarterback for the next few games until Groh emerged as the starting quarterback.  The Cavaliers finished 9–3 for the 1994 season with a win over Texas Christian University in the Independence Bowl. 

Groh led the Cavaliers to a 9–4 record in the 1995 season highlighted by a 33–28 win over Florida State, a share of the ACC Championship, and a win over Georgia in the Peach Bowl. In the 1995 season, UVA's only losses were by a touchdown or less to Michigan, Texas, North Carolina, and Virginia Tech. Groh's father Al Groh was hired as the head football coach at Virginia starting five years after Mike graduated.

NFL Combine

Coaching career

New York Jets
Groh was hired as an assistant for his father Al, who was head coach of the New York Jets in 2000.

Virginia
Groh was hired on the Virginia staff in 2001 as the wide receivers coach before he took on the task of coaching the Cavalier quarterbacks in 2003 along with the receivers. In 2006, he was named the team's offensive coordinator. He was relieved of the offensive coordinator position at the University of Virginia in December 2008.

Alabama
Groh spent the 2009 season at Alabama as an offensive graduate assistant as the Crimson Tide recorded a 14–0 record en route to the National Championship.

Louisville
Louisville Cardinals head coach Charlie Strong announced, on January 13, 2010, that he has hired Mike Groh to coach the quarterbacks at University of Louisville.

Return to Alabama
On February 7, 2011, it was announced he had been given the job of wide receivers coach at the University of Alabama.

Chicago Bears
On February 21, 2013, it was announced that Groh was hired by the Chicago Bears as wide receivers coach.

Los Angeles Rams
On January 25, 2016, the Los Angeles Rams announced they had hired Groh as their new passing game coordinator and wide receivers coach.

Philadelphia Eagles
On January 21, 2017, Groh was hired by the Philadelphia Eagles as their wide receivers coach under head coach Doug Pederson. After the 2017 season when the Eagles won Super Bowl LII against the New England Patriots, Frank Reich was hired as head coach of the Indianapolis Colts, and Groh was promoted to offensive coordinator to Pederson. Groh was fired from the Eagles on January 9, 2020 after they fell to the Seattle Seahawks in the Wild Card Round of the NFL Playoffs.

Indianapolis Colts
On February 1, 2020, Groh was hired by the Indianapolis Colts as their wide receivers coach, reuniting with former Philadelphia Eagles offensive coordinator and current Colts head coach Frank Reich.

New York Giants
On February 10, 2022, Groh was hired by the New York Giants as their wide receivers coach under head coach Brian Daboll.

Personal life
Groh is the son of former American football coach Al Groh and his brother, Matt, is the director of player personnel for the New England Patriots.

References

External links
 New York Giants profile

1971 births
Living people
American football quarterbacks
Alabama Crimson Tide football coaches
Chicago Bears coaches
Indianapolis Colts coaches
Louisville Cardinals football coaches
National Football League offensive coordinators
New York Giants coaches
New York Jets coaches
People from Randolph, New Jersey
Philadelphia Eagles coaches
Players of American football from New Jersey
Randolph High School (New Jersey) alumni
Rhein Fire players
Sportspeople from Charlottesville, Virginia
Sportspeople from Morris County, New Jersey
Virginia Cavaliers football coaches
Virginia Cavaliers football players